Tall Snake is the debut EP by the English rock band Bôa. It was released on 28 April 1999. It contains three versions of the single "Duvet". They include the original version, an acoustic version, and an electronic version mixed by DJ Wasei. It also includes two non-album songs. During the recording of this EP the band consisted of Alex Caird, Ben Henderson, Jasmine Rodgers, Steve Rodgers, Lee Sullivan and Paul Turrell.

Personnel
 Alex Caird - bass guitar
 Ben Henderson - electric and acoustic guitars, saxophone, percussion
 Jasmine Rodgers - lead vocals, acoustic guitars, percussion
 Steve Rodgers - electric and acoustic guitars, vocals
 Lee Sullivan - drums, percussion
 Paul Turrell - keyboards, strings arrangements, percussion, electric guitars

1999 EPs
Bôa albums